Gloria Valencia de Castaño (27 July 1927 – 24 March 2011) was a Colombian journalist and television presenter, best known as the "first lady" of Colombian television. She was born in Ibagué and died in Bogotá.

External links 
Colombia's 'First Lady' of television Gloria Valencia dies, Colombia Reports, 25 March 2011

1927 births
2011 deaths
Colombian television journalists
Colombian television presenters
Colombian women journalists
Colombian women television presenters
Colombian women television journalists